Chloe Howman (born 1978 in London, England) is an English actress. The daughter of actor Karl Howman, her sister is actress Katy-Jo Howman.

Career
The sisters' first appearance was in 1986 with their father, as children in his series Brush Strokes. After training at LAMDA, Chloe's adult roles started in 1997 in the soap opera Family Affairs as Julie-Ann Jones, daughter of Pete Callan. She later appeared as Tara in Hollyoaks: Movin' On, and as Helen in the series Life Begins and Making Waves. She later appeared in HolbyBlue in a leading role.

Howman appeared in the BBC medical drama, Casualty as staff nurse, Rita Freeman. Howman made her first appearance on 10 August 2013 and chose to leave the show in 2016, after nearly three years, her final scenes aired on 16 July 2016.

Filmography

Personal life

Howman married Danny Hodkinson in 1999 and they have one child.  Howman was married to actor Paul Thornley from 2013 until 2017. The couple have one child.

References

External links
 

1978 births
Living people
Alumni of the London Academy of Music and Dramatic Art
English television actresses
English soap opera actresses
English film actresses